Nicolas Delmotte (born 29 August 1978) is a French show jumping competitor. He represented France at the 2020 Summer Olympics in Tokyo 2021, competing in individual jumping.

References

 

1978 births
Living people
French male equestrians
Equestrians at the 2020 Summer Olympics
Olympic equestrians of France
French show jumping riders
21st-century French people